Collect Your Hand Luggage is a 1963 British TV play starring Kenneth More.

Premise
A middle-aged man has a younger lover.

Production
Kenneth More later wrote "this was to be my first real impact on the small screen. At that time other actors of my standing were rather afraid of TV. And they thought that it was somehow beneath them to transfer from the big screen to the small. I did not have much option."

It was More's first appearance on commercial television. At the time he said he admired the work of John Mortimer and Ted Kotcheff, adding "When I found that combination coinciding with the postponement of my next film I couldn't resist 
the opportunity."

Reception
Variety said it was "enticing in prospect, and it only disappointed. on the highest level. The piece was slight in content; but glossily finished, and it provided Kenneth More with a glove-made part which he fitted superbly."

References

External links
Collect your Hand Luggage at IMDB

1960s television plays